Ichak (also referred to as Puranaichak) is a village in the Ichak CD block in the Hazaribagh Sadar subdivision of the Hazaribagh district in the Indian state of Jharkhand.

History
Ichak was the old capital of Ramgarh Raj since 1772. Over a hundred temples were built under the patronage of Raja Tej Singh and his successors. Budhiya Mandir Lohri is the best known.

Geography

Location

Area overview
Hazaribagh district is a plateau area and forests occupy around about 45% of the total area. It is a predominantly rural area with 92.34% of the population living in rural areas against 7.66% in the urban areas. There are many census towns in the district, as can be seen in the map alongside. Agriculture is the main occupation of the people but with the extension of coal mines, particularly in the southern part of the district, employment in coal mines is increasing. However, it has to be borne in mind that modern mining operations are highly mechanised. Four operational areas of Central Coalfields are marked on the map. All these areas are spread across partly this district and partly the neighbouring districts.

Note: The map alongside presents some of the notable locations in the district. All places marked in the map are linked in the larger full screen map. Urbanisation data calculated on the basis of census data for CD blocks and may vary a little against unpublished official data.

Civic administration

Police station
Padma police station serves the Ichak CD block.

CD block HQ
The headquarters of Ichak CD block are located at Ichak.

Demographics
According to the 2011 Census of India, Puranaichak had a total population of 2,280, of which 1,169 (51%) were males and 1,111 (49%) were females. Population in the age range 0-6 years was 375. The total number of literate persons in Puranaichak was 1,534 (80.52% of the population over 6 years).

Transport
The Ichak More-Goplo road links Ichak to National Highway 20 and also to the Hazaribagh-Hazaribagh Road station (Suriya) road.

Education
KN+2 High School was established by Raja Kamakhya Narayan. It is one of the oldest and first higher education institute.

Ghanshyam Mehta Institute at Ichak was established in 2007. It offers intermediate courses in arts and commerce.

Ghanshyam Mehta Evening College, Ichak

Healthcare
There is a primary health centre at Ichak.

References

Villages in Hazaribagh district